Ogygioses luangensis is a species of moth of the  family Palaeosetidae. It is found in Thailand.

References

Moths described in 1995
Hepialoidea
Moths of Asia